43 athletes (36 men and 7 women) from Czech Republic competed at the 1996 Summer Paralympics in Atlanta, United States.

Medallists

See also
Czech Republic at the Paralympics
Czech Republic at the 1996 Summer Olympics

References 

Nations at the 1996 Summer Paralympics
1996
Summer Paralympics